Bin Wang (born October 25, 1944) is a Chinese meteorologist who is currently a professor at University of Hawaii in Manoa.  He won the Carl-Gustaf Rossby Research Medal 2015.  The Carl-Gustaf Rossby Research Medal is the highest award for atmospheric science of the American Meteorological Society. It is presented to individuals on the basis of outstanding contributions to the understanding of the structure or behavior of the atmosphere.

Wang was awarded The Regents’ Medal for Excellence in Research in 2013.  This is awarded by the University of Hawaii Board of Regents in recognition of scholarly contributions that expand the boundaries of knowledge and enrich the lives of students and the community.

Wang is a professor and chair at the Department of Meteorology at the University of Hawai‘i and a team leader at the International Pacific Research Center. Wang is a noted meteorologist specializing in climate and atmospheric dynamics and has pioneered greater understanding of the dynamics and predictability of tropical climate and global monsoons in the Asian-Pacific region.

He has shared his expertise and insights through more than 260 scholarly publications and participated in pivotal international scientific conferences. He influences the future of the field through his extraordinary commitment to training PhD graduates and postdoctoral associates, some of which have now become prominent scientists in the field.

Wang was elected as a fellow of the American Meteorological Society in 2008 in recognition of his distinguished contributions to atmospheric research and service to the community. He received the Scientist of the Year award from ARCS Foundation in 2012.

Wang's research papers has over 28,000 citations.

References

1944 births
Living people
Chinese meteorologists
University of Hawaiʻi faculty
People from Qingdao
Scientists from Shandong
Chinese emigrants to the United States
Educators from Shandong
Fellows of the American Meteorological Society